Canoochee is a census-designated place and unincorporated community in Emanuel County, Georgia, United States. Its population was 70 as of the 2020 census. Georgia State Route 192 passes through the community.

Demographics

History
Linguist William Bright believes "Canoochee" may be a name derived from the Muscogee language, meaning "little ground". The Georgia General Assembly incorporated the place as the "Town of Canoochee" in 1912, with town corporate limits extending in a one-half mile radius from the Savannah and Statesboro Railway depot. The town's charter was officially dissolved in 1995.

References

Populated places in Emanuel County, Georgia
Census-designated places in Georgia (U.S. state)